This article lists all power stations in Liberia.

Hydroelectric

Thermal

See also 
 Energy in Liberia
 List of power stations in Africa

References 

Liberia
 
Power stations